The Fourth Government of the Lao People's Democratic Republic was established on 24 February 1998.

Ministries

Committees

References

Specific

Bibliography
Books:
 

Governments of Laos
1998 establishments in Laos
2002 disestablishments in Laos